Harsh Mander (born 17 April 1955) is an Indian author, columnist, researcher, teacher, and social activist who started the Karwan-e-Mohabbat campaign in solidarity with the victims of communal or religiously motivated violence. He is the Director of the Centre for Equity Studies, a research organisation based in New Delhi. He also served as Special Commissioner to the Supreme Court of India in the Right to Food Campaign and was a member of the National Advisory Council of the Government of India, set up under the UPA government.
 He has occasionally come under media attention for his liberal views.

Career
Mander formerly worked in the Indian Administrative Services(IAS), serving in the predominantly tribal states of Madhya Pradesh and Chhattisgarh for almost two decades. After Gujarat Riot, Mander left the service in 2002, and started social activism.
He is a founding member of the National Campaign for the People’s Right to Information. He was a Member of the Core Groups on Bonded Labour and Mental Hospitals of the statutory National Human Rights Commission of India; and also on various national official National Committees such as those for Social Protection and the Below Poverty Line (BPL) populations.

From October 1999 to March 2004, he worked as Country Director, ActionAid India, a development support organization. He is Founder-Chairperson of the State Health Resource Centre, Chhattisgarh, which established the Mitanin Community Health Programme, the forerunner of the Asha Programme, and the Chairperson of INCENSE (The Inclusion and Empowerment of People with Severe Mental Disorders). He is also a member of the Working Group of the Project on Armed Conflict Resolution & People's Rights, University of California, Berkeley.

He was appointed a Member of India’s National Advisory Council by the council President Sonia Gandhi in June 2010. He convened the working groups on the Food Security Bill, Land Acquisition and Rehabilitation Bill, Child Labour Abolition, Urban Poverty and Homelessness, Disability Rights, Bonded Labour, Street Vendors and Urban Slums, and co-convened the groups on the Communal and Targeted Violence Bill, Dalits and Minorities and Tribal Rights, among others. His tenure was not renewed in 2012.

Teaching career
Harsh Mander teaches courses on poverty and governance at the Indian Institute of Management Ahmedabad, and St. Stephen’s College, Delhi. He taught at the Nelson Mandela Centre for Peace and Conflict Resolution at Jamia Millia Islamia, Delhi and at the Lal Bahadur Shastri National Academy of Administration, Mussoorie while he was Deputy Director of the institution, during which he also played a dominant role in the Right to Information Act (RTI). He has also lectured at the California Institute of Integral Studies, San Francisco; the Centre for Law and Governance, Jawaharlal Nehru University, Delhi; Institute of Development Studies, University of Sussex, UK; NALSAR University of Law, Hyderabad; MIT, Boston; University of California, Los Angeles (UCLA) and at the Universities of Stanford, Washington (Stanford), Austin, among others.

Literary works
Harsh Mander has written and co-authored several books and regularly writes columns for newspapers like The Hindu, Hindustan Times and Dainik Bhaskar, and contributes frequently to scholarly journals. His stories have been adapted into films such as Shyam Benegal’s Samar, and Mallika Sarabhai’s dance drama, Unsuni.

Some of his selected publications include: 
 (2019) 'Between Memory and Forgetting: Massacre and the Modi Years in Gujarat' (New Delhi, Yoda Press)
 (2019) 'Partitions of the Heart: Unmaking the Idea of India' (New Delhi, Penguin Viking)
 (2018) 'The Right to Food Debates: Social Protection for Food Security in India' (New Delhi, Orient Blackswan) (authored with Ashwin Parulkar, Ankita Aggarwal)
 (2018) 'Reconciliation: Karwan e Mohabbat’s Journey of Solidarity through a Wounded India' (New Delhi, Context) (co-authored with Natasha Badhwar).
 (2016) 'Fatal Accidents of Birth: Stories of Suffering, Oppression and Resistance' (New Delhi, Speaking Tiger Books)
 (2015) 'Looking Away: Inequality, Prejudice and Indifference in New India' (New Delhi, Speaking Tiger Books)
 (2012) 'Ash in the Belly: India's Unfinished Battle Against Hunger' (New Delhi, Penguin India)
 (2009) 'Fear and Forgiveness' (New Delhi, Penguin India)

Awards
Among his awards are the Rajiv Gandhi National Sadbhavana Award for peace work, the M.A. Thomas National Human Rights Award in 2002, the South Asian Minority Lawyers Harmony Award in 2012 and the Chisthi Harmony Award in 2012.

See also
 Vijay Shankar Pandey, whistle blower IAS
Natasha Badhwar

References

External links

Harsh Mander's column in The Hindu
'Obedience Pushes You To Fascism' Harsh Mander interview, Outlook, 15 April 2002
Looking Away: Inequality, Prejudice and Indifference in New India at Speaking Tiger Books
http://www.yodapress.co.in/between-memory-and-forgetting

1956 births
Living people
Adivasi activists
Indian columnists
Indian male essayists
20th-century Indian essayists
Social workers
Activists from Madhya Pradesh
Social workers from Chhattisgarh
Indian Administrative Service officers